Terence Benjamin Saramandif (born 29 March 2002) is a Mauritian slalom canoeist who has competed at the international level since 2017. He won a gold medal at the 2018 Summer Youth Olympics in C1 Obstacle Slalom event.

Saramandif also won two medals at the 2018 African Youth Games with a gold in C1 Slalom and a bronze in C1 sprint. He placed 30th and 16th in the C1 event at the 2018 and 2019 Junior World Championships, respectively, and 25th in the same event at the 2021 U23 World Championships in Tacen.

References

Living people
2002 births
Mauritian Creoles
Mauritian male canoeists
Canoeists at the 2018 Summer Youth Olympics
Youth Olympic gold medalists for Mauritius